Jocara zetila is a species of snout moth in the genus Jocara. The species was first described by Herbert Druce in 1902. It is found in Guatemala and Colombia.

References

Moths described in 1902
Jocara